The Science and Technology Act 1965 is an Act of the Parliament of the United Kingdom which established the Science Research Council and the Natural Environment Research Council, and made provision for their financing; it reallocated certain responsibilities for research, and gave powers to the Minister of Technology.

Background 
The United Kingdom Government recognised in the early 1960s that there were a number of agencies responsible for conducting civil scientific research, yet these were fragmented and responsibilities were divided. These agencies had been established over the past 50 years and varied in status, scope and autonomy. The Government believed that the modernisation of British industry, and the revitalisation of the economy through science and technology, could not be implemented effectively under these arrangements.

In March 1962 the Government appointed a Committee of Inquiry chaired by Sir Burke Trend to examine whether any, and what, changes in the arrangements were desirable; the relative importance of the national interest for the promotion of civil scientific research; and the methods of financing of these agencies. The Committee reported in October 1963. It recommended disbanding the Department of Scientific and Industrial Research (established 1915) and its Council and distributing their functions to three new agencies. These were to be: the Science Research Council, the Natural Resources Research Council, and the Industrial Research and Development Authority.

The Trend Committee identified that the Medical Research Council (1913), the Agricultural Research Council (1931), the National Research Development Corporation (1948) and the UK Atomic Energy Authority (1954) should remain largely unchanged.

The Trend Committee report was accepted by the Conservative Government. However, the enabling legislation could not be passed before the general election was called in October 1964. The incoming Labour Government largely endorsed the Trend Committee recommendations, with the exception of the proposals for industrial research, for which the Government established the Ministry of Technology.

The 1965 Act established the other agencies identified by the Trend Committee: the Science Research Council and the Natural Environment (not Resources) Research Council.

Science and Technology Act 1965 
The Science and Technology Act (1965 c. 4) received Royal Assent on 23 March 1965. Its long title is: ‘An Act to make further provision with respect to the responsibility and powers in relation to scientific research and related matters of the Secretary of State, the Minister of Technology and certain chartered bodies and other organisations, and for purposes connected therewith.’

Provisions 
The Act comprises 7 Sections and 4 Schedules.

 Section 1. The Research Councils. The Research Councils shall be the Agricultural Research Council and the Medical Research Council; and two bodies to be established: the Science Research Council and the Natural Environment Research Council; the roles of these bodies.
 Section 2. Expenses, accounts etc. of Research Councils. The Secretary of State may pay the Research Councils out of money provided by Parliament.
 Section 3. Re-allocation of activities connected with scientific research. The Department of Scientific and Industrial Research shall be dissolved and its functions taken over by an appropriate Research Council; the National Institute for Research in Nuclear Science shall be taken over by the Science Research Council; the activities of the Nature Conservancy and the National Oceanographic Council shall be taken over by the Natural Environment Research Council.
 Section 4. Extension of research functions of Atomic Energy Authority. Functions shall include the undertaking of scientific research in matters not connected with atomic energy. 
 Section 5. Further powers of Secretary of State and Minister of Technology. The Secretary of State and the Minister of Technology may defray out of moneys provided by Parliament any expenses which, with the consent of the Treasury, they may incur.
 Section 6. Supplementary. Defines ‘scientific research’, and amends the legislation specified in Schedule 4.
 Section 7. Short title.

Schedules

 Schedule 1. Reports, Accounts etc. of Research Councils. Keeping and submission of accounts to the Minister and Secretary of State.
 Schedule 2. Minor and consequential Amendments. Minor legislative amendments.
 Schedule 3. Transitional Provisions on Redistribution of Activities of existing Organisations. Transfer of all property, rights, liabilities and obligations on an agreed transfer date.
 Schedule 4. Repeals. Repeal of legislation.

Aftermath 
The Agricultural Research Council (ARC) was reformed as the Agricultural and Food Research Council (AFRC) in 1983, which became part of the Biotechnology and Biological Sciences Research Council (BBSRC) in 1994.

The Science Research Council (SRC) became the Science and Engineering Research Council (SERC) in 1984.

The Medical Research Council and the Natural Environment Research Council both still operate under their original names.

References 

United Kingdom Acts of Parliament 1965
1965 in the United Kingdom
Law of the United Kingdom